Electric Tears is the ninth studio album by Buckethead. It is considered one of his most emotional and introspective albums, bearing many similarities to his previous release Colma. The entire album is played solely on acoustic and electric guitar.

In 2010, the album was released directly from TDRS Music. The album Electric Sea is a direct sequel to this album, released in 2012.

The Ultimate Guitar community ranked the album 12th on the list of "25 Greatest Instrumental albums of all time".

Track listing

Credits
Buckethead - acoustic guitar, electric guitar, production
Janet Rienstra - production
Dom Camardella - mixing, mastering, engineering, co-production
Robert Hadley - mastering

References

2002 albums
Buckethead albums